Luserna (Cimbrian: Lusérn) is a comune (municipality) in Trentino in the northern Italian region Trentino-Alto Adige/Südtirol, located about  southeast of Trento.

Luserna is part of the Magnificent Community of the Cimbrian Highlands (Altipiani Cimbri) together with the municipalities of Lavarone and Folgaria. In the tourist sphere it is part of the Alpe Cimbra. Since 2021 it has been one of the most beautiful villages in Italy.

Lusérn borders the following municipalities: Caldonazzo, Lavarone, Levico Terme, Pedemonte, Rotzo and Valdastico.

Cimbrian culture and language 

Lusérn is the centre of Cimbrian language and culture. In the 2021 census, around 68,8% of the people of Lusérn stated Cimbrian, an Upper German dialect of the Germanic language, to be their first language.

The Cimbrian spoken in Lusérn is a slightly different dialect from Cimbrian spoken elsewhere.

Point of interest 

The little village of Luserna have eight restaurant/hotel, four museums and four thematic trails that tell the Cimbrian legends and stories. They are passable by families and mountain bikes and are immersed in the alpine nature. In winter they become splendid paths suitable for snowshoeing. For more info

Story  

Luserna was born around the year 1400 from Bavarians populations coming from nearby Lavarone who decided to stay and live here. In 1710 Luserna became independent from Lavarone. Until 1918 it was included in the Austro-Hungarian Empire, precisely in the County of Tyrol. During the last years of the 1800s it became famous for its tradition of bobbin lace and thanks to the Austrian administration, it had both the German and the Italian schools. 

After the annexation to the Kingdom of Italy and with the advent of fascism, the people of Luserna were forbidden to speak Cimbro. This is because one of the dogmas of fascism was to Italianize every village and culture. This caused the phenomenon of the Options, an agreement between the Third Reich and the Kingdom of Italy to distribute the Mochen, Cimbrian and German populations who had lived for millennia in the ancient county of Tyrol, which later became the region of Venice Tridentine.

After the Second World War, thanks to the Gruber–De Gasperi Agreement, the Cimbrian linguistic minority of Luserna became part of the autonomy basis of the Autonomous Province of Trento and the Trentino - South Tyrol Region. In 1987 the Mocheno Cimbro Institute was founded and in 2001 the Cimbrian language was officially recognized within the regulations for the protection of Trentino linguistic minorities. In 2008 the regulations were implemented, including the compulsory teaching of the language in schools and the use of the Cimbrian language in public administration documents.

Demographic evolution

Notes and references

External links

Cities and towns in Trentino-Alto Adige/Südtirol